Area code 912 is a telephone area code in the North American Numbering Plan (NANP) for the southeastern part of the U.S. state of Georgia.  The numbering plan area contains Savannah, Richmond Hill, Hinesville, Vidalia, Metter, Reidsville, Homerville, Waycross, Brunswick, Folkston, Douglas, Statesboro, Ludowici, Jesup and Kingsland. The area code was created in 1954 in an area code split from area code 404, which had been assigned to the entire state in 1947.

History
In 1947, when the American Telephone and Telegraph Company (AT&T) divided North America into numbering plan areas (NPAs) for the first nationwide telephone numbering plan, the state of Georgia received only one area code, 404, for the entire state.  The city of Atlanta operated one of the eight Regional Centers in the nationwide telephone toll routing system.

On July 1, 1954, the state was divided into two numbering plan areas. The area from Macon southward, including Savannah and Albany, received area code 912. Area code 404 was reduced to the northern half of the state, from the Tennessee and North Carolina borders as far south as Columbus and Augusta.

Despite the presence of Savannah, Albany and Macon, the southern half of Georgia is not nearly as densely populated as the north. As a result, 912 remained the sole area code for south Georgia for 46 years, while north Georgia was subdivided in to three distinct numbering plan areas and was also overlaid during the 1990s, By the end of the 1990s, 912 was on the brink of exhaustion due to the proliferation of cell phones and pagers, especially in Savannah, Macon, and Albany.

On August 1, 2000, area code 912 was reduced in size in a three-way split to permit more central office codes in the southern half of the state. Savannah and the eastern portion retained 912. The western portion, centered on Albany, was assigned area code 229, while the northern portion, centered on Macon, received area code 478. Permissive dialing of 912 continued across southern Georgia until August 1, 2001. NANPA projections of October 2022 suggest that coastal Georgia will require an overlay area code around 2027.

Prior to October 2021, area code 912 had telephone numbers assigned for the central office code 988. In 2020, 988 was designated nationwide as a dialing code for the National Suicide Prevention Lifeline, which created a conflict for exchanges that permit seven-digit dialing. This area code was therefore scheduled to transition to ten-digit dialing by October 24, 2021.

Service area
The service area of area code 912 includes the counties of Appling, Atkinson, Bacon, Brantley, Bryan, Bulloch, Camden, Candler, Charlton, Chatham, Clinch, Coffee, Echols (part with area code 229), Effingham, Emanuel (part with area code 478), Evans, Glynn, Jeff Davis, Liberty, Long, McIntosh, Montgomery, Pierce, Screven, Tattnall, Telfair (part with area code 229), Toombs, Treutlen, Ware, Wayne, and Wheeler.

See also
List of NANP area codes

References

External links

List of exchanges from AreaCodeDownload.com, 912 Area Code

912
912